Catharine is a feminine given name, a variation of Katherine or Catherine. Notable people with the name include:

In education:

 Catharine Beecher, noted educator
 Catharine MacKinnon, American feminist, scholar, lawyer, teacher, and activist
 Catharine Merrill, one of the first female university professors in the United States

In literature:
 Catharine Webb Barber (1823-?), American newspaper editor, author
 Catharine Carver (1921–1997), American-British publisher's editor
 Catharine H. Esling (1812-1897), American writer
 Catharine Hitchcock Tilden Avery, 1844–1911), American author, editor, educator 
 Catharine Trotter Cockburn, 1679–1749), English novelist, dramatist, philosopher
 Catharine Dixon, Canadian journalist and author of non-fiction books
 Catharine Sedgwick, American novelist

In science:
 Catharine Cox, American psychologist known for her work on intelligence and genius
 Catharine Garmany, astronomer

In rulers:
 Catherine the Great, Empress of Russia from 1762 till 1796 known as the country's longest-ruling female.

Feminine given names